Rissoina delicatissima is a species of minute sea snail, a marine gastropod mollusk or micromollusk in the family Rissoinidae.

Description

Distribution
This species occurs in the Pacific Ocean off Easter Island.

References

 Raines. 2002. Contribution to the knowledge of Easter Island Mollusca. Conchiglia 34 (304): 11-40
 Bouchet, P.; Fontaine, B. (2009). List of new marine species described between 2002-2006. Census of Marine Life

Rissoinidae
Gastropods described in 2002